Victoria Michaels is a Ghanaian-Nigerian model, fashion icon, actress, brand ambassador and philanthropist. She is the recipient of several accolades, including Ghana Models Awards, Glitz Style Awards, and the City People Entertainment Awards.

Early life and education
Victoria was born in Accra to Nigerian father and Nigerian-Ghanaian mother. She is fifth child out of six children of their family. She had her primary education at Anglican Girls Grammar School, Delta State, Nigeria and joined Mawuko Girls Senior High School for her secondary education. She pursued Business  Management and Communication at Ghana Institute of Journalism earned a Diploma in Mass Communication. She holds a Bachelor of Science Degree from Central University College.

Career
Victoria had her first stint at modeling at the age of 19 but couldn't pursue it because of her education. She actively started modeling in 2013 after she got her first degree. She has since featured in major publications including Canoe Magazine, Roots Paris, Destiny Connect, True Love magazine, Bona Magazine, Canoe Magazine, Vogue Italia, OkayAfrica Magazine, Elle South Africa, O Yes! and Glam Africa Magazine.

She has modeled for BBC Fashion Show, Dubai Fashion Show, Africa Fashion Week London, African Fashion International Johannesburg, Men's Health Fashion Week, South Africa Fashion Week, Accra Fashion Week, FIMA International Fashion Show, Mercedes Benz African fashion festival, and Dark & Lovely Fashion Show.
She has appeared in commercials as brand ambassador for Melcom Ghana, Leasafric Ghana Limited and Hertz Franchise.

Charity
Victoria owns a charitable foundation which she established in 2013. She established the Victoria Michaels Foundation, a charity organization which helps improve the lives of underprivileged children through the Africa Literacy Development Initiative (ALDI) project in Education, Women/Girl child Empowerment and Youth Empowerment within Africa.

Awards and nominations 
2018 - Model of the year - Glitz Africa Awards
2018 - Classic Model of the year- Accra Fashion Week.
2017 - Fashion Personality Of The Year  - Eagles Summit 
   2017 - Inspiring Personality of the Year Award  - Ghana Nigeria Achievers Awards
2017 - Distinguished Eminent Model Award  - GIJ Eminence Awards
2017 -Angel of Hope Award for Humanitarian Activities  - Ovation Magazine
2017- Honoree for Contribution to Fashion home and abroad  and role in  women and children empowerment-                           Africa Fashion Week Toronto
  2016- Commercial model (FEMALE) of the Year- AFROMA Awards
2016 - Best New Actress of the Year – City People Entertainment Awards.
2016 - Model of the year - Glitz Africa Awards.
2016 - Model of the Year  - Ghana Models Awards
2016 - Humanitarian Personality Award  - UMB Ghana Tertiary Awards

References

Living people
People from Accra
Ghanaian female models
Year of birth missing (living people)